The 1931 Colorado Teachers Bears football team was an American football team that represented the Colorado State Teachers College (later renamed University of Northern Colorado) in the Rocky Mountain Conference during the 1931 college football season.  The team was led by fourth year head coach Bill Saunders and the Bears finished with an overall and conference record of 2–4–1.

Schedule

References

Colorado Teachers
Northern Colorado Bears football seasons
Colorado State Teachers Bears football